Edward Potts Cheyney, A.M., LL.D. (1861–1947) was an American historical and economic writer, born at Wallingford, Pennsylvania. He graduated from the University of Pennsylvania in 1883. He visited German universities and studied at the British Museum. He was elected as a member of the American Philosophical Society in 1904. The University of Pennsylvania conferred the degree of LL.D. on him in 1911.

His writings were employed as college textbooks.  They include:
 Social Changes in England in the Sixteenth Century (1896)
 Social and Industrial History of England (1901)
 Short History of England (1904)
 European Background of American History (1904)
 Readings in English History (1908)
 A History of England, from the Defeat of the Armada to the Death of Elizabeth (two volumes; volume i, 1914)

References

External links 
 
 
 Official University of Pennsylvania Biography at Penn People
 American Historical Association biography

1861 births
1947 deaths
People from Nether Providence Township, Pennsylvania
Historians from Pennsylvania
Presidents of the American Historical Association
University of Pennsylvania Law School alumni
Economists from Pennsylvania
Members of the American Philosophical Society